This is a list of the lists of small Solar System bodies and dwarf planets.

 Lists of comets
 List of minor planets
 List of named minor planets (alphabetical)
 List of named minor planets (numerical)
 List of exceptional asteroids
 List of trans-Neptunian objects
 List of fast rotators (minor planets)
 List of slow rotators (minor planets)
 List of tumblers (small Solar System bodies)
 List of unnumbered minor planets
 Meanings of minor-planet names

See also
 Lists of astronomical objects
 List of natural satellites
 List of possible dwarf planets
 List of Solar System objects by size

External links